Greg Shaw (born 15 February 1970) is a Scottish former footballer who played over 160 league games for Ayr United, Falkirk, Dunfermline Athletic, Airdrieonians, Clydebank and Berwick Rangers mostly in the 1990s. Shaw played as a forward.

His son, Oli Shaw, is also a footballer.

Honours
Falkirk
Scottish Challenge Cup: 1993–94

References

External links

1970 births
Living people
Scottish footballers
Footballers from Dumfries
Ayr United F.C. players
Falkirk F.C. players
Dunfermline Athletic F.C. players
Airdrieonians F.C. (1878) players
Clydebank F.C. (1965) players
Berwick Rangers F.C. players
Scottish Football League players
Association football forwards